Nii Adamah Plange (born 26 June 1989) is a Ghanaian-born Burkinabé professional footballer who plays mainly as a right winger.

Club career
Born in Accra, Ghana, Plange began his career with local Feyenoord, moving to ASEC Mimosas on loan in July 2009. In the summer of 2012, following another spell with Feyenoord Ghana, he moved to Portugal and joined Sporting CP, initially being assigned to the reserves in the second division. He made his Primeira Liga debut in the last day of the season, playing one minute in a 4–1 away win against S.C. Beira-Mar.

On the last day of the summer transfer window of 2013, Plange moved to fellow league club Vitória de Guimarães. He played his first competitive game for his new team on 14 September, coming on as a 58th-minute substitute in a 1–0 success at Rio Ave FC. he scored his first goal in the Portuguese top level the following 8 February, but in 2–3 away loss to Vitória de Setúbal.

Plange signed a two-year deal with Académica de Coimbra (also in the Portuguese top flight) on 16 July 2015.

International career
Plange made his international debut for Burkina Faso on 10 August 2011, in a friendly game against South Africa. He was selected by manager Paulo Duarte as he possessed dual nationality due to being married to a Burkinabé woman.

References

External links

1989 births
Living people
Burkinabé people of Ghanaian descent
Footballers from Accra
Ghanaian footballers
Burkinabé footballers
Association football wingers
Association football utility players
West African Football Academy players
ASEC Mimosas players
Primeira Liga players
Liga Portugal 2 players
Segunda Divisão players
Sporting CP B players
Sporting CP footballers
Vitória S.C. players
Vitória S.C. B players
Associação Académica de Coimbra – O.A.F. players
C.D. Nacional players
C.D. Pinhalnovense players
Burkina Faso international footballers
Ghanaian expatriate footballers
Burkinabé expatriate footballers
Expatriate footballers in Ivory Coast
Expatriate footballers in Portugal
Ghanaian expatriate sportspeople in Ivory Coast
21st-century Burkinabé people